1 Contra Todos (: One Against All) is a Brazilian drama television series produced by FIC and Conspiração Filmes and aired by FOX Brasil.

The series is written by Thomas Stavros, Gustavo Lipsztein and Breno Silveira. Breno Silveira directed the episodes, with script by Thomas Stavros and Gustavo Lipsztein.

The series was nominated three consecutive years for the International Emmy Award, in 2017 and 2018 for Best Performance by an Actor for Júlio Andrade, and in 2018 and 2019 for Best Drama Series for its second and third season.

The fourth and final season will air in 2020, after a hiatus of almost two years. The renovation was made in 2018, and the new season was shot in 2019 and will end the series plot.

Synopsis

Season 1 
Cadu (Júlio Andrade), who is about to become a father for the second time, loses his job. His situation becomes even more complicated when, by mistake, he is unjustly condemned for the crime of drug trafficking in Taubaté, in the interior of São Paulo. Trying to survive the prison, he is forced to lie and to engage in criminal behavior. He has the help of Professor (Adélio Lima), a man who has been imprisoned for more than 25 years for trafficking and murder. Considered a counselor inside the penitentiary, he knows everything that goes on inside. Believing that Cadu is innocent, Professor becomes a father figure to him. The former lawyer also has the support of China (Thogun Teixeira) and Mom (Sílvio Guindane). The first, convicted of murder, believes in his lies, which leads him to become his friend and personal security guard, risking his own life to protect the 'Doctor of Traffic'. The second, convicted of attempted murder, follows the orders of China, chief of the cell where he is being held. On the other hand, the arrival of Cadu makes Playboy (Sacha Bali), convicted of bank robbery and gang formation, to lose his position in the chain hierarchy, which makes this ambitious young man become an enemy of Cadu. The penitentiary is under the command of the director Demosthenes (Adriano Garib), an ambitious and corrupt man who transforms the life of Cadu into a hell. Meanwhile, his wife Malu (Julia Ianina), willing to do anything to save her husband, enters the charade of Cadu's new identity and becomes the 'first lady' of drug trafficking. The case of Cadu is still investigated by Jonas (Caio Junqueira), a federal police officer who has been working for years to raise evidence against the Santa Cruz de La Sierra Cartel. Reason why you believe in the innocence of Cadu.

Cast

Episodes

Season 1 (2016) 
 A Justiça é Cega (Justice is Blind)
 Lei Vem do Rei (Law Comes from the King)
 Caminho do Crime (Crime path)
 Reino Encantado (Enchanted Kingdom)
 Dr X Dr
 Verdade Não Se Cria (Truth is not created)
 A Final (The Final)
 Agora é Contra Todos (Now it's against everyone)

Season 2 (2017) 
 A Prisão É Para Sempre (Prison is forever)
 O Caça-Deputados (The Deputy Hunter)
 Ícaro (Icarus)
 Pais e filhos (Fathers and Sons)
 Mensageiro da Verdade (Menssenger of the truth)
 Veneno da lata (Poison in a can)
 Brincadeira de gente grande (Big people's play)
 Fim da estrada (The end of the road)

Season 3 (2018) 
 A Mentira é a Verdade (The Lie is the Truth)
 Um homem morto (A Dead Man)
 A Bala (The Bullet)
 O Grande César (The Great César)
 Ayahuasca
 Ka-Bum
 César Está Vivo (César is Alive)
 Paco tem que Morrer (Paco need to die)

Season 4 (2020) 
 Pax Romana
 Todos os caminhos levam a Miami (Every path take to Miami)
 Dinheiro é a lei (Money is the Law)
 Família Nostra (Our Family)
 Presente de Grego
 Criador e Criatura (Criator and Criature)
 Pagando o Preco
 Libertade

Awards and nominations

Golden Nymph Award

International Emmy Award

Paulista Association of Art Critics

Platino Awards

Extra Television Award

12 Awards Fiesp / Sesi-SP of Cinema and TV

References

External links 
 Official Website
 

2016 Brazilian television series debuts
2010s Brazilian television series
2020 Brazilian television series endings
2020s Brazilian television series
Brazilian crime television series
Brazilian drama television series
Brazilian prison television series
Portuguese-language television shows
Television shows set in Brasília
Television shows set in São Paulo
Television shows set in Bolivia
Television shows set in Miami
Works about organized crime in Brazil